Senator Kitchell may refer to:

Aaron Kitchell (1744–1820), New Jersey State Senate
Wickliffe Kitchell (1789–1869), Illinois State Senate

See also
Jane Kitchel (born 1945), Vermont State Senate